Kozik is a surname. Notable people with the surname include:

 Andrzej Kozik (born 1953), Polish luger
 Frank Kozik (born 1962), American graphic artist
 Krzysztof Kozik (born 1978), Polish goalkeeper
 Leonid Kozik, president of the Federation of Trade Unions of Belarus
 Yulia Kozik (born 1997), Russian basketball player